The Zawinul Syndicate was a jazz fusion band formed by Austrian keyboardist Joe Zawinul in 1988. The band evolved out of Zawinul's former band Weather Report. The band adhered to Zawinul's roots in jazz. Their style could be described as a combination of unusual grooves, driving and swinging rhythms and many borrowings from different music cultures.

Zawinul himself stated that he gave the band its name due to a syndicate bearing more resemblance to a family than "just" a band.

After the death of Zawinul in 2007, several members of The Zawinul Syndicate decided to reform and perform Zawinul's music live under the shortened name The Syndicate.

Members 
Many different musicians have been part of Zawinul's Syndicate. For example:

Drummers
 Cornell Rochester
 Rodney Holmes
 Paco Séry
 Mike Baker
 Nathaniel Townsley
 Karim Ziad
 Stéphane Galland
 Kirk Covington

Percussionists
 Manolo Badrena
 Arto Tunçboyacıan
 Robert Thomas Jr.
 Aziz Sahmaoui
 Jorge Bezerra Jr.
 Bill Summers
 Lynne Fiddmont
 Abdou M' Boup

Bassists
 Gerald Veasley
 Matthew Garrison
 Richard Bona
 Victor Bailey
 Linley Marthe
 Étienne M’Bappé

Guitarists
 Scott Henderson 
 Randy Bernsen
 Gary Poulson
 Alegre Corrêa
 Amit Chatterjee

Singers
 Maria João
 Sabine Kabongo
 Carl Anderson
 Leata Galloway

The last concert of the band took place on 3 August 2007 in Güssing, Austria, six weeks before Zawinul's death.

Discography 
Discography per Allmusic.

Albums

 The Immigrants (CBS, 1988)
 Black Water (CBS, 1989)
 Lost Tribes (Columbia, 1992)
 Vienna Nights – Live At Joe Zawinul's Birdland (BHM, 2005)
 75th (BHM, 2008)

References 

Jazz fusion ensembles